Johnson Field may refer to:

Sports Stadiums
 Johnson Field (stadium), officially LaRee and LeGrand Johnson Field, a stadium at Utah State University
 Johnson Field (Binghamton), a baseball stadium that was located in Binghamton, New York. Johnson Field was torn down to help construct New York Route 17
 Johnson Field (Yale), a field hockey facility in New Haven, Connecticut on the campus of Yale University.

Airfields
 Johnson Field (Michigan), an airport in Smiths Creek, Michigan, United States
 Johnson Field (North Carolina), an airport in Archdale, North Carolina, United States
 Delaware County Airport, also known as Johnson Field, in Muncie, Indiana, United States
 Johnson Field, Japan, later Johnson Air Base; the name of Iruma Air Base when operated by the United States Air Force